State Route 71 (SR 71) is a state highway in the northwest part of the U.S. state of Georgia. The highway runs  from Dalton northeast and, then, north, to the Tennessee state line, northeast of Cohutta, where the roadway continues as Tennessee State Route 60.

Route description

SR 71 begins at an intersection with US 41/US 76/SR 3 in Dalton as the Cleveland Highway. South of the intersection, the roadway continues as North Glenwood Avenue. The route briefly heads north out of the city. It then turns northeast before heading north for the rest of its routing. In Varnell is an intersection with SR 2. About two miles before the Tennessee State Line, the route narrows to two lanes. At the state line, SR 71 meets its northern terminus continuing into Bradley County towards Cleveland as Tennessee State Route 60.

History

Major intersections

See also

References

External links

071
Transportation in Whitfield County, Georgia
Dalton metropolitan area, Georgia